Drumized is the third release by Chiptune and noise artist DJ Scotch Egg, which was released on Load Records. The album features a more abrasive sound similar to Scotch Dub and KFC Core. There is also experimentation with Circuit Bending and live instruments, one of which was played by Anders Hana of Noxagt and formerly of Jaga Jazzist.

Track listing 

WWWWW
Drumized 
Countdown 1, 2, 3  
Scotch Circus 
Scotch Grind  
Scotch Phantom  
Scotch Boogy  
Yeah, Final Yo 
Scotch Metronorm 
Scotch Circus 2  
Scotch Grind 2 
Scotch Beatbox (beatbox by Ned) 
Scotch Jazz (with Anders Hana) 
Scotch Stoner 
Scotch Jazzzzz  
Ummmmm.............

2008 albums
DJ Scotch Egg albums